The Lunenburg Correctional Center  is a state prison for men located in Victoria, Lunenburg County, Virginia, owned and operated by the Virginia Department of Corrections.  

The facility was opened in 1995 and has a daily working population of 1185 inmates, held at a range of security levels.

Notable inmates 
Willie Ben Jones: Serial killer

References

Prisons in Virginia
Buildings and structures in Lunenburg County, Virginia
1995 establishments in Virginia